West River is an unincorporated community in the geographic township of Mongowin, Sudbury District in Northeastern Ontario, Canada. It is named for the West River, which flows through the community just upstream of its mouth at the Whitefish River.

The community was formerly a stop along the Algoma Eastern Railway, which linked Manitoulin Island with Lake Huron's North Shore and, ultimately, with Sudbury. The historic rail line has been defunct for a number of years and the tracks have been lifted south of Espanola.

References 

Communities in Sudbury District